Chloé Dygert (born January 1, 1997) is an American professional racing cyclist, who currently rides for UCI Women's WorldTeam . She has won seven gold medals at the UCI Track Cycling World Championships and a silver medal at the Olympic Games. She also won the Women's junior road race and Women's junior time trial at the 2015 UCI Road World Championships.

Career
Chloé Dygert was athletic from childhood on and played mainly basketball in her early years. However, she did not take cycling seriously until after a shoulder injury in 2013. After another injury she was forced to retire from basketball. In 2015 she became national junior champion, in road racing and individual time trial, as well as two-time Junior World Champion in the same disciplines. Then she received an invitation from the US cycling federation USA Cycling.

In March 2016, Dygert started at the World Cup in London as a member of the US four-in-four team pursuit and won the world title with the team. In the same year, nineteen-year-old Dygert was nominated to participate in the Olympic Games in Rio de Janeiro, where she won a silver medal in the team pursuit.

The 2016 Olympic Pursuit Team was marked by controversy. The head coach, Andy Sparks, was fired for fostering a hostile environment. Dygert supported Sparks and continued to work with him until 2018.

At the 2017 UCI Track Cycling World Championships in Hong Kong, she became World Champion in the team pursuit for the second time, along with Kelly Catlin, Jennifer Valente and Kimberly Geist and clinched the world title in the singles pursuit. In May 2017, she won her first Panamerican title, in the individual time trial on the road.

At the 2018 UCI Track Cycling World Championships, Dygert won two titles: along with Kelly Catlin, Jennifer Valente and Kimberly Geist in the team pursuit and in the individual pursuit. She succeeded the victory in the individual pursuit in an outstanding manner: she set a world record two times in a row, in the qualification as well as in the final (3:20.060 minutes). Her record from the final caught the record of road cycling time-trial world champion, the Dutchwoman Annemiek van Vleuten. In the Pan American Games in 2019 she won gold in the individual time trial.

On September 24, 2020, at the UCI Road World Championships, Dygert crashed during the women's time trial event, suffering a laceration to her left leg which required surgery. That November, Dygert signed a four-year contract with UCI Women's WorldTeam , from the 2021 season.

Personal life
In November 2016, she married fellow professional cyclist Logan Owen and took his surname. However, the marriage ended in divorce in January 2020.

A 2020 profile by her sponsor Red Bull noted that she is a conservative who does not believe in feminism. Dygert issued a public apology in November 2020 for her social media conduct that was deemed inappropriate. Some criticized her apology as "not sufficient".

Career achievements

Major results

Road

2013
 Amateur National Road Championships
3rd Road race
3rd Time trial
2015
 UCI Junior Road World Championships
1st  Road race
1st  Time trial
 Amateur National Road Championships
1st  Road race
1st  Time trial
2016
 6th Overall Tour of California
1st  Young rider classification
1st Stage 2 (TTT)
2017
 1st  Time trial, Pan American Road Championships
 4th Time trial, UCI Road World Championships
2018
 Tour of the Gila
1st Stages 2 & 3 (ITT)
 2nd Chrono Kristin Armstrong
 6th Overall Joe Martin Stage Race
1st  Young rider classification
1st Stage 4
2019
 1st  Time trial, UCI Road World Championships
 1st  Time trial, Pan American Games
 1st  Overall Colorado Classic
1st  Points classification
1st  Mountains classification
1st  Young rider classification
1st Stages 1, 2, 3 & 4
 1st  Overall Joe Martin Stage Race
1st  Points classification
1st  Mountains classification
1st  Young rider classification
1st Stages 1 & 4
 1st Chrono Kristin Armstrong
 2nd Overall Tour of the Gila
1st  Young rider classification
1st Stages 3 (ITT) & 4
 Professional National Road Championships
2nd Time trial
4th Road race
2021
 1st  Time trial, National Road Championships

Track

2016
 1st  Team pursuit, UCI Track World Championships
 2nd  Team pursuit, Olympic Games
2017
 UCI Track World Championships
1st  Individual pursuit
1st  Team pursuit
 UCI Track World Cup
1st  Individual pursuit – Los Angeles
1st  Team pursuit – Los Angeles
2018
 UCI Track World Championships
1st  Team pursuit
1st  Individual pursuit
2019
 1st  Team pursuit, Pan American Track Championships
2020
 UCI Track World Championships
1st  Team pursuit
1st  Individual pursuit

World records

References

External links

1997 births
Living people
American female cyclists
American track cyclists
Cyclists at the 2016 Summer Olympics
Cyclists at the 2019 Pan American Games
Cyclists at the 2020 Summer Olympics
Medalists at the 2016 Summer Olympics
Medalists at the 2020 Summer Olympics
Olympic silver medalists for the United States in cycling
Olympic bronze medalists for the United States in cycling
Pan American Games medalists in cycling
Pan American Games gold medalists for the United States
People from Brownsburg, Indiana
UCI Road World Champions (women)
UCI Track Cycling World Champions (women)
Medalists at the 2019 Pan American Games
21st-century American women
Cyclists from Indiana